The action of 30 September 1639 was a naval battle near Mormugão, just south of Goa, India, when a squadron of 9 Dutch ships captured and destroyed 3 Portuguese galleons.

The Portuguese galleons Bom Jesus 74 and São Sebastião 50 were being careened and had their guns removed and were captured without fighting. Bom Jesus was set alight and allowed to drift toward the new galleon São Boaventura, which was refusing to surrender, causing São Boaventura to catch fire and blow up. Some of the unarmed "frigates" approached toward the end but were frightened off by the Dutch boats. The Dutch had a total of 261 guns, 810 sailors, and 170 soldiers on their ships.

Ships involved

Netherlands (Cornelis Symonsz Van der Veer)
Haarlem (flag)
Middelburch (second flag)
Franicker – damaged
Bredamme (Jan Semeijn)
Zierickzee
Valckenburch (yacht)
Cleen Rotterdam (yacht)
Cleen David (yacht)
Arnemuijden (yacht)

Portugal
São Boaventura (Álvaro de Sousa) – caught fire and blew up
Bom Jesus – uncrewed; captured and burnt
São Sebastião – captured
10 or 12 "frigates"

References 

1639
1639 in Asia
Action of 1639-09-30
Naval battles involving Portugal
Conflicts in 1639